Quinhamel is a city in Guinea-Bissau and the capital of the Biombo Region. It has a population of 2,887 (2008 est).

References

Biombo Region
Populated places in Guinea-Bissau
Sectors of Guinea-Bissau